NGC 7315 is a lenticular galaxy in the constellation of Pegasus. It was discovered on 11 September 1872 by Édouard Stephan. It was described as "very faint, extremely small, round, brighter middle" by John Louis Emil Dreyer, the compiler of the New General Catalogue.

SN 2007B, a type Ia supernova, was discovered in NGC 7315 in January 2007.

References

Notes

External links

Lenticular galaxies
Pegasus (constellation)
7315
12097
069241